Sydir Tverdokhlib (9 May 1886, Berezhany - 15 October 1922, Kamionka Strumiłowa) – Ukrainian poet, translator and politician.

He studied at the University of Lviv and the University of Vienna, later he worked as a teacher in Lviv. Tverdokhlib's first poems appeared in the magazines "Svit" (1906), "Bukovyna", "Rozvaha" and others.

He published a separate collection of poems V svichadi plesa (1908). He also wrote the novels Neskinchenyy arkhytvir and others. Tverdokhlib's poetry was filled with melancholy and longing for beauty. He also translated several poems from and into Ukrainian. Into Ukrainian - Ojciec zadżumionych, W Szwajcarii by Juliusz Słowacki and others.

Tverdokhlib also published in Polish periodicals.

Tverdokhlib was a candidate for a member of the Sejm of the Republic of Poland. Breaking the boycott of the elections led to a death sentence for him by the Ukrainian Military Organization. Tverdokhlib was shot during the election campaign, on October 15, 1922, in Kamionka Strumiłowa. As a result of the elections, the party won five parliamentary seats.

He was buried at the Lychakiv Cemetery in Lviv (field 76). His friend, the sculptor , intended to make a monumental tombstone with symbolic statues for him, but the poet's widow gave up on this idea and ordered an ordinary tombstone.

References

Bibliography 

 
 

1886 births
1922 deaths
20th-century Ukrainian poets
Ukrainian translators
20th-century Ukrainian politicians
20th-century Polish politicians
Assassinated Ukrainian politicians
Assassinated Polish politicians
Burials at Lychakiv Cemetery
Ukrainian–Polish translators